"Let's Forget About It" is a song by Lisa Loeb from her 1997 album Firecracker. It is about a mistake that she has made in a relationship, and she just wants her and her boyfriend to forget about it. There is a lyric where she says, "I'll stop crying on the mountain that we made from the molehill where we spilled the milk".  In other words, she is saying there is no use crying over spilled milk, which means not to worry about the little things in life. The lyrics of last line she says in a request form, "I'll stop crying if you'll stop lying to me." The song is also on Loeb's 2006 greatest hits album, The Very Best of Lisa Loeb. The single peaked at #39 on Billboard's Top 40 Mainstream chart, #38 on Billboard's Adult Top 40 chart, #71 on The Billboard Hot 100, and #18 on the American Top 40 radio show/chart.

Charts

References

1997 singles
Lisa Loeb songs
Songs written by Lisa Loeb
Geffen Records singles